Staphyloxanthin is a carotenoid pigment that is produced by some strains of Staphylococcus aureus, and is responsible for the characteristic golden color that gives S. aureus its species name. Staphyloxanthin also acts as a virulence factor. It has an antioxidant action that helps the microbe evade death by reactive oxygen species produced by the host immune system. 

When comparing a normal strain of S. aureus with a strain modified to lack staphyloxanthin, the wildtype pigmented strain was more likely to survive incubation with an oxidizing chemical such as hydrogen peroxide than the mutant strain was. Colonies of the two strains were also exposed to human neutrophils.  The mutant colonies quickly succumbed while many of the pigmented colonies survived.  Wounds on mice were inoculated with the two strains.  The pigmented strains created lingering abscesses.  Wounds with the unpigmented strains healed quickly. These tests suggest that the staphyloxanthin may be key to the ability of S. aureus to survive immune system attacks.

Drugs designed to inhibit the bacterium's production of the staphyloxanthin may weaken it and renew its susceptibility to antibiotics.  In fact, because of similarities in the pathways for biosynthesis of staphyloxanthin and human cholesterol, a drug developed in the context of cholesterol-lowering therapy was shown to block S. aureus pigmentation and disease progression in a mouse infection model.

References

External links
 Staphyloxanthin on www.genome.jp

Carotenoids
Glucosides
Staphylococcus